The Bekisopa mine is a large iron mine located in Tanamarina Bekisopa, Haute Matsiatra in central Madagascar. Bekisopa represents one of the largest iron ore reserves in Madagascar and in the world having estimated reserves of 130 million tonnes of ore grading 14% iron metal.

See also 
 Mining industry of Madagascar

References 

Iron mines in Madagascar